The 1959 Furman Purple Hurricane football team was an American football team that represented Furman University as a member of the Southern Conference (SoCon) during the 1959 NCAA University Division football season. In their second season under head coach Bob King, Furman compiled a 3–7 record, with a mark of 3–2 in conference play, placing fourth in the SoCon.

Schedule

References

Furman
Furman Paladins football seasons
Furman Purple Hurricane football